Thierry Van Den Daele (born 27 May 1966) is a former professional tennis player from France.

Career
Van Den Daele made the second round of the 1986 French Open, after securing a win over Switzerland's Claudio Mezzadri. He then lost to fellow qualifier Jose Clavet in four sets.

In the 1987 French Open, Van Den Daele lost in the opening round to Jordi Arrese. He also exited in the first round of the mixed doubles, with partner Karine Quentrec.

References

1966 births
Living people
French male tennis players